Football in Panama is run by the Federación Panameña de Fútbol. The association administers the national football team, as well as the LPF. Football is the most popular sport in Panama. Panama qualified for the 2018 FIFA World Cup.

Domestic football

In 1988 professional football was established in Panama. Gary Stempel is considered an influential figure in improving Panama football.

In 2017, a separate women's league, the Liga de Fútbol Femenino, was established, with the aim to improve women's football in the country.

League system

National team

The 2010s, the national team experienced its greatest success by being runners-up in the 2013 CONCACAF Gold Cup and qualifying for 2018 World Cup.

Meanwhile, Panama women's team has reached the playoffs for the first time during the 2019 FIFA Women's World Cup qualification, although its dream was cut short by losing to Argentina. Panama later repeated the feat by reaching the playoffs of 2023 FIFA Women's World Cup, with the aim to qualify for the first Women's World Cup continues.

Stadiums in Panama 

The Estadio Rommel Fernández, the national football stadium of Panama, is the largest stadium in the country.

References